Gamètì/Rae Lakes Airport  is located at Gamèti, Northwest Territories, Canada. Barren-ground caribou may be found on the runway. The airport has a small terminal building.

Airlines and destinations

References

External links

Certified airports in the North Slave Region